Saribas is an area made up of the three main rivers in the Betong Division of Sarawak, Malaysia. The three rivers are Batang Layar, Batang Paku, and Batang Rimbas.

Populated places in Sarawak